Jaspa's Journey – The Great Migration is a children's fantasy adventure written by Dr. Rich Meyrick and published in 2009 by DreamCatcher Publishing in Saint John, New Brunswick. It introduces the diminutive creatures known as the "Ses", tiny relations of the different animals for which they are named. It tells the story of Jaspa, a giraffeses who sets out on a traditional rite of passage journey known to his herd as The Great Migration.

Plot summary
Along with his brother Bisckits and cousin Portia (the Rubani), Jaspa joins a group of gnuses (known as the Nomads) to lead the wildebeests across the accurately recreated Serengeti as part of their annual migration for survival. Jaspa takes his journey, which marks the transition to adulthood for giraffeses, a year after the other giraffeses his age, in order to keep a promise he made to his dying mother: that he would accompany his younger brother Bisckits on his journey.  Knowing Bisckits' penchant for trouble, Jaspa stays true to his word.

After much travel, and the meeting of many new friends, Jaspa's journey takes an unexpected twist that not only challenges his perception of the world, but also shows the inquisitive giraffeses that there are many adventures to be had, including helping their new friend Gravee (a West Highland Terrier dogses) find his way back home to Edinburgh, Scotland.

Educational value
Every location visited in Jaspa's Journey – The Great Migration is a real-world setting, adding an educational element to this children's story. Environmental and historical details have also been meticulously researched and woven into the story.

References

External links 
 

2009 Canadian novels
Children's fantasy novels
Canadian fantasy novels
Canadian children's novels
Novels set in Tanzania
Children's novels about animals
2009 children's books